Ahn Jae-hong (born March 31, 1986) is a South Korean actor. He made his professional acting debut in 2009. He is known for her work in both film and television. He gained recognition through his roles in the films The King of Jokgu (2013) and Fabricated City (2017) and in the television series Reply 1988 (2015–2016), Fight for My Way (2017) and Be Melodramatic (2019)

Early Years
Ahn, a youngest of two sons, born in and raised in Busan. He didn't really dream of being an actor, however he really like watching movies since his childhood. He used to rent film from video rental store in front of his house. Ahn naturally enrolled to film department in Konkuk University. In 2nd year, due to all his male seniors enlistment, Ahn became the male lead in a regular summer performance in his college. He played Jang Deok-bae in director Jang Jin's play Clumsy People. Ahn also directed and acted in short film during his college years.

Career

Early Career 
After graduated, he performed onstage at Daehangno and working part-time at a movie theater. In his spare times, he wrote down his ideas, and made short films which He directed himself. Ahn auditioned for director Son Na-mook open-run New Boeing Boeing (an adaptation of the French play of the same name). He was cast as Sungseon in 2011.

His feature film debut was a minor role as student in drama film The Day He Arrives written and directed by Hong Sang-soo. 

As a result, Ahn shared the Korean Film Directors Guild Award for Best Actor with Kim Chang-hwan and Shim Hee-seop, who starred together with him. 

In the Following year, Ahn acted in Gwanghwamun Cinema's independent sports comedy film The King of Jokgu, featured Jokgu, a Korean cross between football and volleyball. He acted as main character, Hong Man-seop. The film was attracting over 40,000 viewers, breaking records for an indie comedy in Korea and was one of the most well-received indie films from 2014. It made its world premiere at the 18th Busan International Film Festival in 2013. Ahn gained recognition through his roles, which earned him nomination best new actor in many film festivals. He won best new actor award in Wildflower Film Awards and Director's Cut Awards.

In 2013, Ahn appeared in minor roles in Director Hong Sang-soo's Nobody's Daughter Haewon. In the Following year he participated as a staff member in Hill of Freedom.

Reply 1988 
In 2015, Ahn auditioned for television series Reply 1988. He won role Kim Jung-bong (Jung-hwan's older brother. His acting got favorable reviews from viewers, Ahn was given the nickname "Bongvely" by press, a portmanteau of "Bong" from Jung-bong and the English word "lovely".

In January 2016, Ahn, Ryu Jun-yeol, and Go Kyung-pyo were "kidnapped" by Youth Over Flowers team during Reply 1988's reward vacation in Phuket, Thailand. Park Bo-gum who had returned from Phuket early for his Music Bank hosting was taken from Seoul afterward. The four of them did their impromptu trip in Namibia and Zimbabwe for 10 days and returned to South Korea in February 2016. 

In the same year, Ahn made special appearances in two films. He played supporting roles in three films. In the of end 2016, Ahn back onstage in an opening piece at Art Forest Art Hall in Daehangno, director Park Geun-hyung's play Ode to Youth. Ahn played Cheong-chun, alternately with Kim Dong-won and Lee Jae-gyun. Their role was a 22-year-old high school sophomore who is anxious over graduation. It was performed from December 8th to February 12th, 2017.

In 2017, he played a supporting role Director Hong Sang-soo's On the Beach at Night Alone. In the same year, Ahn costarred in South Korean action thriller film Fabricated City directed by Park Kwang-hyun. He acted as Demolition. Followed by television series Fight for My Way (2017). Ahn also starred opposite Lee Sun-kyun as King Yejong in 2017 South Korean period comedy film The King's Case Note. Directed by Moon Hyun-sung, Ahn acted as Yoon Yi-seo, archivist that search for the truth behind a crime that threatens the stability of the kingdom.

In 2018, Ahn took on the role of Han-sol, an aspiring online comic artist in Gwanghamun Cinema's Microhabitat, starring with Esom. This is the debut feature film of director Jeon Go-woon. 

Ahn costarred as supporting role in Director Hong Sang-soo's Leaves of Grass.  

In 2019, Ahn costarred in JTBC drama Be Melodramatic as arrogant and famous drama director Son Beom-soo.

In 2021, Ahn was selected as the third 'Next Actor NEXT Actor' of the 9th Muju Sangol Film Festival, co-organized by Muju Sangol Film Festival and Baek Eun-ha Actors' Research Institute since 2019. Every year, the organizer selects a domestic actor with personality and high potential to focus on acting world.

On December 1, 2021, Ahn signed a contract with Management MMM.

Personal life 
In 2016, soon after the end of tvN's Reply 1988, Ahn confirmed that he was dating a non-celebrity who was five years younger than him. They had already been together for two years when their relationship went public, and they attended the same university. On September 18, 2019 a source from his agency C&L Company confirmed that Ahn had broken up with his girlfriend.

Filmography

Film

Television series

Web series

Television shows

Music videos appearances

Theater

Awards and nominations

References

External links

 

1986 births
Living people
South Korean male film actors
South Korean male television actors
Male actors from Busan
Konkuk University alumni
21st-century South Korean male actors